East Aitape Rural LLG is a local-level government (LLG) of Sandaun Province, Papua New Guinea. Arapesh and Schouten languages are spoken in this LLG.

Wards
03. Poltulul
04. Tales-Iambu
05. Tumeleo Island (Tumleo language speakers)
06. Ali Island (Kap language speakers)
07. Seleo Island (Kap language speakers)
08. Poro Settlement
09. Lupai
10. Wauningi
11. Pes
12. Prou/Vokau
13. Lemieng
14. Chinapeli
15. Kiriel-Kopom
16. Paup
17. Yakamul 1 (Kap language speakers)
18. Yakamul 2 (Kap language speakers)
19. Ulau 1 (Ulau-Suain language speakers)
20. Ulau 2 (Ulau-Suain language speakers)
21. Suain (Ulau-Suain language speakers)
22. Labuain
23. Wamsis (Abu’ Arapesh language speakers)
24. Balup (Abu’ Arapesh language speakers)
25. Matapau (Abu’ Arapesh language speakers)
80. Aitape Urban

Islands

Islands located within the LLG are:

Angel Island, Papua New Guinea
Ali Island
Seleo Island
Tumleo Island

References

Local-level governments of Sandaun Province